This is a list of shopping malls in Croatia.

Zagreb
 Arena Centar (2010)
 Avenue Mall (2007)
 Branimir Center (2003)
 Cascade Centar (closed)
 City Center One East
 City Center One West (2006)
 Cvjetni Prolaz (2011)
 Garden Mall
 Importanne Center (1994)
 Importanne Galleria (1999)
 Kaptol Centar (2000)
 King Cross (2002)
 Mandi (2007)
 Mercatone Emmezeta (2000)
 Mercator Centar (2000, sold and renamed to Super Konzum Radnička)
 Point Shopping Center, Vrbani
 Phoenix Plaza (Sesvete) (2011)
 Prečko Shooping Center
 Supernova (2012)
 Westgate Shopping City, Zaprešić

Sveta Helena
 Outlet Center Sveta Helena (closed)

Sveta Nedelja
 Hoto Centar (2008)

Sveti Križ Začretje
 Roses Fashion Outlet

Split
 City Center One (2010)
 Joker Centar (2007)
 Kaufland Centar (2003)
 Konzum Centar Sirobuja (2010)
 Mall of Split (2015)
 Mercator Centar Solin (2002)
 Prima 3 Centar (2005)
 TC Kaštela Kaštel Sućurac (2004)

Rijeka
 Mercator Centar (2007)
 
 ZTC-Shopping (2012)

Osijek
 Avenue Mall (2011)
 Esseker Centar (2007)
 Eurodom (2011)
 Interspar (2007)
 Mercator Centar (2004)
 Portanova (2011)

Zadar
 Callegro (2008)
 City Galleria (2002)
 Mercator Centar (2005)
 Supernova (2010)

Sisak
 Interspar (2007)
 Kaufland (2004)
 Nama (1974)
 Supernova (2009)

Slavonski Brod
 City Colosseum (2013)
 Supernova (2007)

Varaždin
 City Point (2012)
 Lumini (2011)
 Supernova (2009)

Šibenik
 Supernova (2011)

Dubrovnik
 Sub City Srebreno (2015)

Poreč
 Riva Mall 
 Galerija Poreč

Makarska
 Shopping center sv.Nikola 
 Capitol Park (2014) 
 Shopping center Merces 
 Spot Mall (2020)

References

Croatia
Shopping malls